Mascot is a term for any person, animal, or object thought to bring luck.

Mascot may also refer to:

Places
Mascot, New South Wales, a suburb of Sydney
Mascot, Nebraska, US
Mascot, Tennessee, a city in the United States
Mascot, Virginia, US

Films
Mascots (1929 film), a German silent film
Mascots (2016 film), a Netflix mockumentary film

Other uses
MASCOT, a small asteroid lander on space probe Hayabusa2
Mascot (software), a search engine which uses mass spectrometry data to identify proteins from sequence databases
Mascot (sternwheeler), a steamboat in the Pacific Northwest, U.S., in the late 1800s and early 1900s
"Mascot", the NATO reporting name for the training version of the Soviet Ilyushin Il-28 bomber
Modular Approach to Software Construction Operation and Test, a design method for concurrent systems
Mascot (car), a car made by AB Rååverken
Mascot Pictures Corporation, an American film studio

See also
List of mascots
Mascotte (disambiguation)
"Mask Off", a 2017 song by Future, title occasionally confused for the word mascot